Ivan Vejeeghen (Russian: Иван Выжигин) is an 1829 satirical Russian novel by Thaddeus Bulgarin. It is in the form of a memoir of one Ivan Vejeeghen (or Vyzhigin), a peasant orphan growing up in early 19th century Russia.

The novel is considered to be the first best-seller in Russia, outselling more literary authors such as Pushkin. The first edition sold out in seven days, and seven thousand copies before the end of the year; more than ten thousand were sold overall. By 1832 it had been translated into French, Polish, German, Swedish, Italian, Dutch, Spanish, and English (an English version was published London in 1831 and in Philadelphia in 1832), and was one of the first works of Russian literature to be widely read in the West.

Further reading
Ivan Vejeeghen, volume one at the Internet Archive
Ivan Vejeeghen, volume two at the Internet Archive

References

1829 Russian novels